Bengadawar was a village development committee of the Dhanusa District in the Janakpur Zone of Nepal. At the time of the 1991 Nepal census it had a population of 8,145 and had 1543 houses.

References

External links
UN map of the municipalities of Dhanusa District

Populated places in Dhanusha District